The 2011 CIS/CCA Curling Championships were hosted by the Memorial University of Newfoundland and held in St. John's, Newfoundland and Labrador.

8 Teams in each gender competed at the Championship, including two from Western Canada, two from Ontario, two from Quebec, and two from Atlantic Canada, including the hosts Memorial University.

The Memorial Sea-Hawks became the men's champions, while the Laurier Golden Hawks became the women's champions.

Men

Teams

Round-robin standings

Round-robin results

Draw 1
Wednesday, March 10, 13:30

Draw 2
Wednesday, March 9, 18:30

Draw 3
Thursday, March 10, 9:00

Draw 4
Thursday, March 10, 14:00

Draw 5
Thursday, March 10, 19:30

Draw 6
Friday, March 11, 8:30

Draw 7
Friday, March 11, 14:30

Playoffs

Semifinal

Final

Women

Teams

Round-robin standings

Round-robin results

Draw 1
Wednesday, March 10, 14:00

Draw 2
Wednesday, March 9, 19:00

Draw 3
Thursday, March 10, 8:30

Draw 4
Thursday, March 10, 13:30

Draw 5
Thursday, March 10, 19:00

Draw 6
Friday, March 11, 9:00

Draw 7
Friday, March 11, 13:30

Tiebreakers

Playoffs

Semifinal

Final

See also
Curling
Canadian Curling Association
University and college curling

External links
Main Page - Internet Archive
2011 Draw Schedule

CS
Sport in St. John's, Newfoundland and Labrador
Curling in Newfoundland and Labrador
2011 in Newfoundland and Labrador
March 2011 sports events in Canada